Love & Larceny is a Canadian television film, directed by Robert Iscove and broadcast by CBC Television in 1985. Based on a true story, the film stars Jennifer Dale as Betsy Bigley, a Canadian con woman who successfully defrauded American banks of millions of dollars by posing as the illegitimate daughter of Andrew Carnegie.

The film's cast also included Alf Humphreys, Brent Carver, Ken Pogue, Sheila McCarthy, Ross Petty, Douglas Rain, Patricia Hamilton, Susan Wright, Hugh Webster, Peter Dvorsky and Kenneth Welsh.

The film aired on CBC Television on October 6, 1985.

The film won the Gemini Award for Best TV Movie at the 1st Gemini Awards in 1986. It was also nominated, but did not win, for Best Supporting Actor (Rain), Best Production Design or Art Direction (Milton Parcher), Best Costume Design (Suzanne Mess) and Best Music Composition for a Single Program, Dramatic Underscore (Eric Robertson).

A sequel film, Grand Larceny, was released in 1991 and focused on Bigley's escape from prison by faking her death. Douglas Bowie, the writer of both films, also later collaborated with David Archibald on a stage musical version of Bigley's story, also titled Love and Larceny.

References

External links

1985 television films
1985 films
English-language Canadian films
Canadian biographical drama films
Canadian crime drama films
1980s biographical drama films
CBC Television original films
Gemini and Canadian Screen Award for Best Television Film or Miniseries winners
Biographical films about fraudsters
Cultural depictions of fraudsters
Canadian drama television films
1980s Canadian films